"Tragoudia Gia Tous Mines: The Third Side" (Songs For the Months: The Third Side) is an EP by Greek artist Eleftheria Arvanitaki that was released in 2000. It was a free collector's CD given away with the January 2000 issue of Difono magazine. The material was recorded during rehearsals for the Tragoudia Gia Tous Mines album, making it the unofficially "third side" of the album. However the album is recognized as an official release as revealed in the discography section of her official site.

Track listing 
"To Parapono"   
"Lianotragoudo"  
"Agamemnon" 
"Mavra Pionia"  
"Ola Ta Pire To Kalokairi"

2000 EPs
Eleftheria Arvanitaki EPs